Shobha Karandlaje (born 23 October 1966) is an Indian BJP politician from Karnataka who is currently serving as the Minister of State for Agriculture and Farmers' Welfare in the Second Modi ministry. She is also the Vice President of Bharatiya Janata Party, Karnataka and Member of Parliament representing Udupi Chikmagalur Lok Sabha Constituency. She was a cabinet minister in the Government of Karnataka. She is a close confidant to Karnataka ex Chief Minister B S Yeddyurappa.

Early life
Hailing from Puttur in Coastal Karnataka, Shobha became associated with the Rashtriya Swayamsevak Sangh at a very early age, one of the many women full-time workers of the Rashtriya Swayamsevak Sangh. When she decided to enter politics, the RSS gave her the initial thrust.

Shobha completed her M.A. in Sociology and Master of Social Work from Open University, Mysore and School of Social Work Roshni Nilaya, Mangalore University.

Political career 
She served the Bharatiya Janata Party organisation in various capacities before being elected as an MLC in 2004. She was elected as MLA from Yeswanthpur, Bangalore in May 2008 and was appointed the minister for Rural Development and Panchayat Raj in the B S Yeddyurappa govt.

She was lauded for her performance as the RDPR minister and came to be known as a good administrator. She resigned in 2009 due to a political crisis but was re-instated in 2010 and was entrusted with the Energy portfolio. She was the power minister in the Jagadish Shettar ministry and also had the additional charge of the Food and Civil Supplies department.  She had resigned from BJP and joined KJP formed by ex Chief Minister of Karnataka B. S. Yediyurappa in the year 2012. And was appointed KJP Working President. She contested 2013 assembly election from Rajaji Nagar (Vidhan Sabha constituency) and came third. By January 2014 she was back in BJP when her party KJP merged with BJP.

She then contested the 2014 Indian general election from Udupi Chikmagalur constituency and won by a margin of 1.81 lakh votes. In 2019 General elections she won consistently for second time gaining 7,18,916 votes, adding +6.26 percentage of votes from Udupi Chikmagalur (Lok Sabha constituency).

References

External links
 
 Official biographical sketch in Parliament of India website

1966 births
Living people
State cabinet ministers of Karnataka
Members of the Karnataka Legislative Council
India MPs 2014–2019
Lok Sabha members from Karnataka
People from Dakshina Kannada district
Bharatiya Janata Party politicians from Karnataka
21st-century Indian women politicians
21st-century Indian politicians
Women state cabinet ministers of India
Karnataka MLAs 2008–2013
India MPs 2019–present
Narendra Modi ministry
Women union ministers of state of India
Women members of the Lok Sabha
Women members of the Karnataka Legislative Assembly